Miklós Ligeti (May 1, 1871 – December 10, 1944) was a Hungarian sculptor and artist. His sculptural style integrated elements of impressionism and realism.

Early life
Ligeti was born in Pest. At first a pupil of Alajos Stróbl in Budapest, Ligeti later studied in Vienna, Austria.

Artistic career

Ligeti was also the sculptor of a statue honoring Major General Harry Hill Bandholtz, US Army, for his service to Hungary after World War I. It was installed at the US Embassy in 1936, but was later removed by the communist government after World War II.  It was replaced in 1989. It has been moved again, to Freedom Park, across from the US Embassy. Ligeti was the President of the Hungarian Society of Applied Arts. He died in Budapest.

External links
Biography and works by Miklós Ligeti

Hungarian sculptors
1871 births
1944 deaths
People from Pest, Hungary
20th-century sculptors